Omanodon is a genus of primate related to lemuriforms that lived in Oman during the early Oligocene.

Notes

References

Literature cited 

 
 

Prehistoric strepsirrhines
Fossil taxa described in 1993
Oligocene mammals of Asia
Oligocene primates
†Omanodon
Prehistoric primate genera